Synaptophysin, also known as the major synaptic vesicle protein p38, is a  protein that in humans is encoded by the SYP gene.

Genomics 

The gene is located on the short arm of X chromosome (Xp11.23-p11.22). It is 12,406 bases in length and lies on the minus strand. The encoded protein has 313 amino acids with a predicted molecular weight of 33.845 kDa.

Molecular biology 

The protein is a synaptic vesicle glycoprotein with four transmembrane domains weighing 38kDa. It is present in neuroendocrine cells and in virtually all neurons in the brain and spinal cord that participate in synaptic transmission. It acts as a marker for neuroendocrine tumors, and its ubiquity at the synapse has led to the use of synaptophysin immunostaining for quantification of synapses.

The exact function of the protein is unknown: it interacts with the essential synaptic vesicle protein synaptobrevin, but when the synaptophysin gene is experimentally inactivated in animals, they still develop and function normally. Recent research has shown, however, that elimination of synaptophysin in mice creates behavioral changes such as increased exploratory behavior, impaired object novelty recognition, and reduced spatial learning.

Clinical importance 

This gene has been implicated in X linked intellectual disability.

Using immunohistochemistry, synaptophysin can be demonstrated in a range of neural and neuroendocrine tissues, including cells of the adrenal medulla and pancreatic islets. As a specific marker for these tissues, it can be used to identify tumours arising from them, such as neuroblastoma, retinoblastoma, phaeochromocytoma, carcinoid, small-cell carcinoma, medulloblastoma and medullary thyroid carcinoma, among others. Diagnostically, it is often used in combination with chromogranin A.

See also 

 List of human genes

Interactions 

Synaptophysin has been shown to interact with AP1G1 and SIAH2.

References

Further reading

External links 
 

Glycoproteins
Tumor markers